Amanita rhopalopus is an inedible species of Amanita from North America.

References

External links
 
 

rhopalopus
Fungi of North America